John Jago (1684 – after 1724) was a minister in St. John's, Newfoundland.

Born in Cornwall, England, Jago was educated at Exeter College, Oxford. In 1717 he is known to have been vicar of Saint Keverne, Cornwall.

By 1723 Jago was ministering in St. John's, Newfoundland. In order to help bring order to the colonial town, a number of Saint John's property owners established an association in that year. Jago was one of three justices elected by the association to settle local disputes.

References 

British emigrants to Canada
Canadian people of Cornish descent
1684 births
18th-century deaths
Alumni of Exeter College, Oxford
18th-century English Anglican priests
Canadian Anglican priests
Newfoundland Colony judges